Italian submarine Comandante Cappellini was a World War II Italian  built for the Italian Royal Navy. After Italy's surrender, the submarine was captured by the Japanese and handed over to Germany as UIT-24. Following the capitulation of Germany, the Japanese integrated the boat into their fleet as I-503. Following the end of the war, the United States scuttled the submarine in 1946.

Service history
Operating under the command of Capitano di corvetta Cristiano Masi, later Capitano di corvetta Salvatore Todaro, then of Tenente di vascello Aldo Lenzi, later of Tenente di vascello Marco Revedin and Capitano di corvetta Walter Auconi, Comandante Cappellini carried out several war patrols in the Atlantic Ocean while based in BETASOM, sinking 31,648 gross registered ton of enemy shipping. Was later converted to the transport of strategic materials to and from Japan.
After Italy's capitulation in 1943, the submarine was captured by the Imperial Japanese Navy and handed over to Germany at Sabang on 10 September 1943. Commissioned into the Kriegsmarine as foreign U-boat UIT-24 and assigned to 12th U-boat Flotilla with a mixed Italian and German crew. She remained in the Pacific because of failed attempts to return to the 12th Flotilla base at Bordeaux in occupied France.

At Germany's surrender in May 1945, the submarine was taken over and commissioned into the Imperial Japanese Navy as I-503 (her crew now a mixture of Italians, Germans, and Japanese) and shuttled between ports as a transport submarine.  At Japan's surrender in August 1945, she was seized by the United States Navy, which scuttled her off Kobe on 16 April 1946.

In fiction
Cappellini is mentioned (and seen briefly in some scenes) in the 2011 TV movie The Sinking of the Laconia.
The "Capellini" and her crew are the main subject of a Japanese 2 hour TV 2022 special "Sensuikan Cappellini-go no Boken"
(The adventure of the Submarine Cappellini).

Summary of raiding history

See also
Italian submarines of World War II

References

Notes

Citations

Bibliography

 
Léonce Peillard、長塚隆二（Translation）, Submarine war 1939-1945 (潜水艦戦争 1939-1945), Hayakawa Publishing, 1979 (Japanese)

External links
 Submarine I-503: Tabular Record of Movement
 Comandante Cappellini at regiamarina.net
 About Comandante Cappellini as transport submarine to Singapore
 Comandante Cappellini (1939) Marina Militare website

Marcello-class submarines
Ships built by OTO Melara
Ships built in La Spezia
1939 ships
World War II submarines of Italy
World War II submarines of Germany
World War II submarines of Japan
Submarines of the Kriegsmarine
Foreign submarines of the Imperial Japanese Navy
World War II shipwrecks in the Pacific Ocean
Naval ships of Italy captured by Germany during World War II
Maritime incidents in 1946
Scuttled vessels